Jean Pierre Rosso Génova (born 7 April 1997) is a Uruguayan professional footballer who plays as a right-back for Sarmiento.

Career statistics

Club

References

External links

1997 births
Living people
Uruguayan footballers
Uruguayan expatriate footballers
Association football defenders
Liverpool F.C. (Montevideo) players
Club Atlético Sarmiento footballers
Uruguayan Primera División players
Argentine Primera División players
Uruguayan expatriate sportspeople in Argentina
Expatriate footballers in Argentina